Mirta Acuña de Baravalle (born 12 January 1925) is an Argentine human rights activist who was one of the twelve founders of the Mothers of the Plaza de Mayo and the Grandmothers of the Plaza de Mayo associations.

Biography
The Argentine coup d'état of March 24, 1976 established a terrorist regime that sought to "disappear" their political opponents. Neither another country, the Catholic Church, nor an international humanitarian organization, was willing to condemn the military regime's atrocities. The judicial system systematically rejected legal remedies. 

Baravalle's daughter Ana Maria, who was five months pregnant at the time, and her son-in-law Julio Cesar were among those arrested and "disappeared". The last news Baravalle heard about her daughter was that she had given birth to a girl while in prison.

At the beginning of 1977, Mirta Acuña de Baravalle joined a group of mothers, fathers, and relatives of the disappeared who began to meet in the Plaza de Mayo as a form of nonviolent resistance. The proposal came from Azucena Villaflor, who was later murdered by the dictatorship. This group later became known as the Mothers of the Plaza de Mayo and she was one of its founders.

In October 1977, she received an invitation from Alicia Zubasnabar, another of the Mothers, to form a group of grandmothers who were looking for their missing grandchildren. She was one of the twelve founding women of Abuelas de Plaza de Mayo. Her daughter, son-in-law, and granddaughter are still missing.

In 1986, due to internal discrepancies, Mothers of Plaza de Mayo fractured. Mirta Acuña joined the sector called Mothers of the Plaza de Mayo Fundraiser Line.

References

1925 births
Living people
Mothers of the Plaza de Mayo